Cerovec pri Trebelnem is a small village in the Municipality of Mokronog-Trebelno in southeastern Slovenia. The area is part of the historical region of Lower Carniola. The municipality is now included in the Southeast Slovenia Statistical Region.

Name
The name of the settlement was changed from Cerovec to Cerovec pri Trebelnem in 1953.

Church
The local church in the settlement is dedicated to Saint Ulrich and belongs to the Parish of Trebelno. It was first mentioned in written documents dating to 1526 and was rebuilt in the second half of the 18th century.

References

External links
Cerovec pri Trebelnem on Geopedia

Populated places in the Municipality of Mokronog-Trebelno